David Carter (born 21 April 1956) is a former professional tennis player from Australia. He enjoyed most of his tennis success while playing doubles. During his career, he won six doubles titles with compatriot Paul Kronk. He reached a highest singles ranking of world No. 78 in February 1982 and achieved his highest doubles ranking of world No. 126 in January 1983.

Career finals

Singles (2 runner-ups)

Doubles (6 titles, 7 runner-ups)

External links
 
 

Australian male tennis players
Australian Open (tennis) junior champions
Sportspeople from Bundaberg
Tennis people from Queensland
Living people
1956 births
Grand Slam (tennis) champions in boys' doubles